Cooked rice refers to rice that has been cooked either by steaming or boiling. The terms steamed rice or boiled rice are also commonly used. Any variant of Asian rice (both Indica and Japonica varieties), African rice or wild rice, glutinous or non-glutinous, long-, medium-, or short-grain, of any colour, can be used. Rice for cooking can be whole grain or milled.

Cooked rice is used as a base for various fried rice dishes (e.g. chǎofàn, khao phat), rice bowls/plates (e.g. bibimbap, chazuke, curry rice, dal bhat, donburi, loco moco, panta bhat, rice and beans, rice and gravy), rice porridges (e.g. congee, juk), rice balls/rolls (e.g. gimbap, onigiri, sushi, zongzi), as well as rice cakes and desserts (e.g. mochi, tteok, yaksik).

Rice is a staple food in not only Asia and Latin America, but across the globe, and is considered the most consumed food in the world. The U.S. Department of Agriculture classifies rice as part of the grains food group. Nutritionally, 200 g of cooked steamed white rice contributes  toward the daily recommended  of grains for women and men, respectively, and is considered a good source of micronutrients such as zinc and manganese.

Preparation 

Rice is often rinsed and soaked before being cooked. Unpolished brown rice requires longer soaking time than milled white rice does. The amount of water added can vary depending on many factors. In most cases, double water in proportion to rice is added. Newly harvested rice usually requires less water, and softer varieties need more water than firmer varieties. Rice can be boiled in a heavy-bottomed cookware or steamed in a food steamer. Some boiling methods do not require precise water measurements, as the rice is strained after boiling. This draining method is suitable for the less glutinous varieties such as basmati rice, but not-suitable for varieties like japonica rice which become sticky to some degree when cooked. Optionally, a small amount of salt can be added before cooking. If not drained, boiled rice is usually cooked on high heat until a rolling boil, then simmered with the lid on, and steamed over the residual heat after turning off the heat. Nowadays, electric rice cookers are also commonly used to cook rice. During cooking, rice absorbs water and increase in volume and mass.

Use in dishes 
In East Asia, cooked rice is most commonly served in individual bowls, with each diner receiving one. Food from communal dishes is placed upon the rice, and is then eaten.

Cooked or boiled rice is used as an ingredient in many dishes. Leftover steamed rice is used to make porridge or fried rice dishes. Some common dishes using cooked rice as the main ingredient include:
 Fried rice dishes
 Arroz chaufa
 Bokkeum-bap
 Kimchi fried rice
 Chāhan
 Omurice
 Chinese fried rice
 Hokkien fried rice
 Yangzhou fried rice
 Yin yang fried rice
 Nasi goreng
 Nasi goreng jawa
 Nasi goreng pattaya
 Omelette rice
 Thai fried rice
 American fried rice
 Rice bowls and plates
 Bibimbap
 Hoe-deopbap
 Chazuke
 Dal bhat
 Donburi
 Chūkadon
 Gyūdon
 Katsudon
 Oyakodon
 Unadon
 Tekkadon
 Hainanese chicken rice
 Loco moco
 Panta bhat
 Red beans and rice
 Rice and beans
 Rice and curry
 Rice and gravy
 Tumpeng
 Rice porridges
 Congee
 Juk

 Rice balls and rolls
 Gimbap
 Jumeok-bap
 Lemper
 Onigiri
 Rice ball salads
 Nam khao
 Yam naem
 Sushi
 B.C. roll
 California roll
 Dynamite roll
 Philadelphia roll
 Seattle roll
 Spider roll
 Zongzi
 Rice cakes and desserts
 Mochi
 Tteok
 Yaksik
 Yeot
 Uli/Ulen
 Ketan Duren
 Ketan Susu

Use in beverages 
 Alcoholic
 Amazake
 Awamori
 Cheongju
 Beopju
 Choujiu
 Gamju
 Hariya
 Huangjiu
 Mijiu
 Shaoxing wine
 Lao-Lao
 Makgeolli
 Rượu cần
 Sake a Japanese alcoholic beverage.
 Sato
 Shōchū
 Soju
 Sonti
 Non-alcoholic
 Sikhye

Varieties 
Most common is plain, steamed white rice; however, a number of varieties and are served, many with specific cooking methods. Some varieties include:
 Japonica rice
 Thai steamed rice
 Sticky rice
Sushi rice (cooked with the addition of Japanese rice vinegar and sugar)
 Basmati rice

Gallery

See also 

 Bap
 Food steamer
 List of rice dishes
 List of steamed foods
 Pilaf

References

External links 

 Steamed rice at dmoz.org

Bap
British cuisine
Chinese cuisine
English cuisine
Indonesian cuisine
Japanese cuisine
Korean cuisine
Malaysian cuisine
Philippine cuisine
Rice dishes
Thai cuisine
Vietnamese cuisine